Mohanad Abdulkadhim Qasim Al Jebur Jeahze  (pronounced ; born 10 April 1997) is a professional footballer who plays as a left-back for Major League Soccer club D.C. United. Born in Sweden, he plays for the Iraq national football team.

Early life
Growing up in Linköping, Jeahze started to play football as a youngster with local club Karle IF, in the same age group as fellow professional footballer Simon Olsson. He moved on to IK Östria Lambohov in his teens, that would reform as AFK Linköping, before joining the youth academy of Allsvenskan club IFK Norrköping.

Club career

IFK Norrköping
On 20 June 2016, Jeahze signed a first-team contract with IFK Norrköping. He spent the 2016 and 2017 seasons on loan at affiliated club IF Sylvia in Division 1, Sweden's third tier, making 41 appearances in total.

In 2017, he was loaned out to Degerfors IF in Superettan, the domestic second tier, and played 11 games for the club during the first half of the season. In the summer transfer window, he was sent on loan to Syrianska FC in the same league, but suffered an injury in his debut for the club, that left him sidelined for the rest of the year.

IF Brommapojkarna
On 19 December 2017, Jeahze transferred to IF Brommapojkarna, that recently had been promoted to Allsvenskan, on a four-year deal. He failed to make an impact during the season, playing only ten games in total, as the side finished 14th in the table and was relegated after suffering a defeat to AFC Eskilstuna in the play-offs. He left the club by mutual consent at the end of the year.

Mjällby AIF
On 9 January 2019, Jeahze signed a two-year deal with Mjällby AIF in Superettan. Playing as a left wing-back, he had his breakthrough the same season, playing 27 games and scoring three goals, as the club won the second division.

In 2020, Jeahze missed the start of the Allsvenskan season due to an injury, before making his comeback to the pitch and starting in 12 straight games.

Hammarby IF
On 25 August 2020, Jeahze transferred to Hammarby IF for an undisclosed fee, signing a three and a half-year contract.

On 30 May 2021, Jeahze won the 2020–21 Svenska Cupen, the main domestic cup, with Hammarby through a 5–4 win on penalties (0–0 after full-time) against BK Häcken in the final. He featured in all six games as the side reached the play-off round of the 2021–22 UEFA Europa Conference League, after eliminating Maribor (4–1 on aggregate) and FK Čukarički (6–4 on aggregate, in which Jeahze scored), where the club was knocked out by Basel (4–4 on aggregate) after a penalty shoot-out.

Jeahze featured in the final of the 2021–22 Svenska Cupen, in which Hammarby lost by 4–5 on penalties to Malmö FF after the game ended in a 0–0 draw. In May 2022, Jeahze was linked with a transfer to Scottish Premiership club Celtic, but the deal eventually fell through. On 27 July 2022, Hammarby announced that Jeahze would suspend training with the club indefinitely, due to ongoing transfer talks. The club's decision came after Jeahze caused controversy for reportedly refusing to take part in an Allsvenskan fixture against Varbergs BoIS, following a rejected bid from Turkish Süper Lig club Beşiktaş. About a week later, on 3 August, Jeahze returned to training with Hammarby after issuing an apology to the club. He ended the 2022 season making 26 league appearances, scoring three goals, as the side finished 3rd in the Allsvenskan table.

D.C. United
On 7 December 2022, Major League Soccer club D.C. United announced they had signed Jeahze on a three-year deal, with an option for a further year. Jeahze was signed with targeted allocation money for an undisclosed fee, although reports suggested that it was set at around 7-10 million Swedish kronor.

International career
Although born in Sweden and having played in Sweden's youth selection, Jeahze's family is from Samawah, Iraq and he pledged his allegiance to Iraq in 2020. A year later, in 2021, it was however reported that Jeahze was still undecided on which country to represent internationally, if called up.

On 11 November 2021, Jeahze formally made his debut for Iraq in a 1–1 2022 FIFA World Cup qualification tie with Syria.

Career statistics

Club

Honours
Mjällby AIF
 Superettan: 2019

Hammarby IF
 Svenska Cupen: 2020–21

See also
 List of Iraq international footballers

References

External links

 

1997 births
Living people
Sportspeople from Linköping
Iraqi footballers
Iraq international footballers
Swedish footballers
Swedish people of Iraqi descent
Association football fullbacks
IFK Norrköping players
Degerfors IF players
Syrianska FC players
IF Brommapojkarna players
Mjällby AIF players
Hammarby Fotboll players
D.C. United players
Allsvenskan players
Superettan players
Ettan Fotboll players
Footballers from Östergötland County